In Roman mythology, Mens, also known as Mens Bona (Latin for "Good Mind"), was the personification of thought, consciousness and the mind, and also of "right-thinking". Her festival was celebrated on June 8. A temple on the Capitoline Hill in Rome was vowed to Mens in 217 BC on advice from the Sibylline Books, after the defeat of Lake Trasimene, and was dedicated in 215 BC.

In Latin poetry
Propertius celebrated his escape from erotic bondage to his Cynthia by dedicating himself to the shrine of Mens Bona.

Ovid depicted Cupid as leading Good Sense (Mens Bona) as a captive in his triumphal parade.

Later developments

The Latin word mens expresses the idea of "mind" and is the origin of English words like mental and dementia. The gifted-only organization Mensa International was originally to be named mens in the sense of "mind", but took instead the name Mensa (Latin: "table") to avoid ambiguity with "men's" in English and "mens" in other languages.

See also
Bona Dea
Empedocles
Pudicitia

References

Further reading
 Richardson, L. (1992). A New Topographical Dictionary of Ancient Rome (pp. 251). Baltimore and London: The Johns Hopkins University Press. .
 Scullard, H.H. (1981). Festivals and Ceremonies of the Roman Republic (p. 148). London: Thames and Hudson. .

Health goddesses
Roman goddesses
Personifications in Roman mythology